The Toyota Thailand Open was a badminton tournament that took place at the Impact Arena in Thailand from 19 to 24 January 2021. It had a total purse of $1,000,000.

Tournament
The Toyota Thailand Open was the ninth tournament of the 2020 BWF World Tour and also part of the Thailand Open championships, which had been held since 1984. This tournament was organized by Badminton Association of Thailand and sanctioned by the BWF. It was the second of three BWF tournaments taking place in Thailand in January 2021 following a break caused by the COVID-19 pandemic. Participation in both Thailand Opens was mandatory to qualify for the 2020 BWF World Tour Finals.

Four out of five world number ones withdrew from all three tournaments. The Chinese team withdrew from all three tournaments after failing to get permission to travel to Thailand; affected players include Chen Qingchen and Jia Yifan (women's doubles), and Zheng Siwei and Huang Yaqiong (mixed doubles). In addition, the Japanese team has withdrawn from the tournaments following the positive COVID-19 diagnosis of Kento Momota (men's singles). Following Kevin Sanjaya Sukamuljo's positive COVID-19 diagnosis, he and Marcus Fernaldi Gideon (men's doubles) withdrew from the tournaments. Indian men's singles players B. Sai Praneeth and Kidambi Srikanth had to pull out after Praneeth's positive COVID-19 diagnosis.

Venue
This international tournament was held at the Impact Arena in Pak Kret, Nonthaburi, Thailand.

Point distribution
Below is the point distribution for each phase of the tournament based on the BWF points system for the BWF World Tour Super 1000 event.

Prize money
The total prize money for this tournament was US$1,000,000. Distribution of prize money was in accordance with BWF regulations.

Men's singles

Seeds

 Kento Momota (withdrew)
 Chou Tien-chen (semi-finals)
 Anders Antonsen (semi-finals)
 Viktor Axelsen (champion)
 Anthony Sinisuka Ginting (second round)
 Jonatan Christie (first round)
 Ng Ka Long (second round)
 Lee Zii Jia (first round)

Finals

Top half

Section 1

Section 2

Bottom half

Section 3

Section 4

Women's singles

Seeds

 Tai Tzu-ying (final)
 Akane Yamaguchi (withdrew)
 Nozomi Okuhara (withdrew)
 Ratchanok Intanon (semi-finals)
 Carolina Marín (champion)
 P. V. Sindhu (quarter-finals)
 An Se-young (semi-finals)
 Michelle Li (quarter-finals)

Finals

Top half

Section 1

Section 2

Bottom half

Section 3

Section 4

Men's doubles

Seeds

 Marcus Fernaldi Gideon / Kevin Sanjaya Sukamuljo (withdrew)
 Mohammad Ahsan / Hendra Setiawan (semi-finals)
 Takeshi Kamura / Keigo Sonoda (withdrew)
 Hiroyuki Endo / Yuta Watanabe (withdrew)
 Fajar Alfian / Muhammad Rian Ardianto (first round)
 Lee Yang / Wang Chi-lin (champions)
 Choi Sol-gyu / Seo Seung-jae (second round)
 Aaron Chia / Soh Wooi Yik (final)

Finals

Top half

Section 1

Section 2

Bottom half

Section 3

Section 4

Women's doubles

Seeds

 Yuki Fukushima / Sayaka Hirota (withdrew)
 Mayu Matsumoto / Wakana Nagahara (withdrew)
 Lee So-hee / Shin Seung-chan (final)
 Kim So-yeong / Kong Hee-yong (champions)
 Greysia Polii / Apriyani Rahayu (semi-finals)
 Chang Ye-na / Kim Hye-rin (first round)
 Jongkolphan Kititharakul / Rawinda Prajongjai (quarter-finals)
 Nami Matsuyama / Chiharu Shida (withdrew)

Finals

Top half

Section 1

Section 2

Bottom half

Section 3

Section 4

Mixed doubles

Seeds

 Dechapol Puavaranukroh / Sapsiree Taerattanachai (champions)
 Praveen Jordan / Melati Daeva Oktavianti (first round)
 Yuta Watanabe / Arisa Higashino (withdrew)
 Seo Seung-jae / Chae Yoo-jung (final)
 Chan Peng Soon / Goh Liu Ying (quarter-finals)
 Hafiz Faizal / Gloria Emanuelle Widjaja (quarter-finals)
 Marcus Ellis / Lauren Smith (second round)
 Tang Chun Man / Tse Ying Suet (second round)

Finals

Top half

Section 1

Section 2

Bottom half

Section 3

Section 4

Notes

References

External links
 Tournament Link

Thailand Open II
Badminton, World Tour, Thailand Open II
Badminton, World Tour, Thailand Open II
2020 II
Badminton, World Tour, Thailand Open II